The streaked spiderhunter (Arachnothera magna) is a species of bird in the family Nectariniidae.

Description
It is similar in size to a sparrow. It is olive yellow in color, with multiple darker streaks. It has a long, curved black beak and yellow legs. Below, it is pale yellow streaked with black. Its beak is specially adapted for a nectar diet.

Distribution and habitat
It is found in Bangladesh, Bhutan, Cambodia, China, India, Laos, Malaysia, Myanmar, Nepal, Thailand, and Vietnam. In India, it is found in the Eastern Indian states. Its natural habitats are subtropical or tropical moist lowland forest and montane forest.

Behavior
This species can be found alone or in pairs. The nesting season is from March to July. The nest is usually made of leaves that are tied together with cobwebs, and they are found attached to the reverse side of a leaf.

Diet
It feeds on the nectar of flowers such as the wild banana blossom.

Gallery

See also

References

External links
 
 

streaked spiderhunter
Birds of Eastern Himalaya
Birds of Southeast Asia
Birds of Yunnan
streaked spiderhunter
Articles containing video clips
Taxonomy articles created by Polbot